The Achi I government governed the Ivory Coast between 2021 and 2022. It was dissolved in 2022 and replaced with the Achi II government.

Ministers 

 Patrick Achi
 Kandia Camara
 Téné Birahima Ouattara
 Kaba Nialé
 Amadou Koné

References

See also 

 Politics of Ivory Coast

2021 establishments in Ivory Coast
2022 disestablishments in Ivory Coast
Cabinets established in 2021
Cabinets disestablished in 2022
Politics of Ivory Coast